Anne Benoît is a French actress. She has appeared in more than 60 film and television productions since 1981.

Career
Benoît was trained at the Conservatoire de Versailles, under the direction of Marcelle Tassencourt. She later attended the Tania Balachova theatre school, and enrolled in workshops conducted by Antoine Vitez, Sophie Loucachevsky and Aurélien Recoing. She made her film debut in the 1981 film Schools Falling Apart (Le Bahut va craquer) directed by Michel Nerval.

Theater

Filmography

References

External links
 

Living people
French film actresses
French television actresses
French stage actresses
20th-century French actresses
21st-century French actresses
Year of birth missing (living people)
Place of birth missing (living people)